Fukina Mizuno (born 31 January 2001) is a Japanese professional footballer who plays as a midfielder for WE League club INAC Kobe Leonessa.

Club career 
Mizuno made her WE League debut on 12 September 2021.

References 

Living people
2001 births
Japanese women's footballers
Women's association football midfielders
Association football people from Kyoto Prefecture
INAC Kobe Leonessa players
WE League players